Haddou is a surname. Notable people with the surname include:

Insaf Zoubida Haddou (born 1992), Algerian female volleyball player
Ismaël Haddou (born 1996), Algerian footballer 
Jadour Haddou (born 1949), Moroccan middle-distance runner
Madjid Ben Haddou (born 1975), Algerian footballer
Moulay Haddou (born 1975), Algerian footballer
Nadir Haddou (born 1983), French cyclist
Saïd Haddou (born 1982), French cyclist
Yassine Haddou (born 1989), French footballer